Brdo is a settlement in the Municipality of Domžale in the Upper Carniola region of Slovenia.

Name
Brdo was attested in written sources as Ek in 1345 and  Echk in 1410, among other spellings.

Church

The church in Brdo is located above the hamlet of Goropeče. It is dedicated to the Saint Nicholas. It is a chapel of ease and belongs to the parish of Saint George in Ihan. The church is originally a Gothic single-nave church that was reworked in the Baroque style in 1750, when the bell tower and chapel were added. The sacristy dates from 1718. The rib-vaulted chancel dates to the 14th century and contains paintings by a student of the 15th-century master painter Bolfgang. The church has Renaissance and Baroque furnishings, and the main altar was created in 1669.

References

External links 

Brdo on Geopedia

Populated places in the Municipality of Domžale